Pauoa may refer to:
Pauoa, Hawaii
Ctenitis squamigera, fern commonly known as Pauoa